Ladislav Fialka (August 22, 1931 in Prague – February 22, 1991 in Prague) was a mime from what is now the Czech Republic.

In 1956 he founded a theater. Helena Philipová, Ivan Vyskočil, Jiří Suchý and Vladimír Vodička also contributed to the theater organization. By 1958, Divadlo Na zábradlí (Theatre at the Railing) was born from this, the only independent pantomime theater in Eastern Europe, and then "Divadlo Na zábradlí" became one of the outstanding workshops of modern Czech theater. In 1968, he was also able to present the works of Václav Havel (Garden Festival, Leirat). Legendary performances were the adaptation of Franz Kafka's The Trial of King Ubu and Miloš Macourek's play Zsuzsanna. From 1962, the previously banned Jan Grosmann became the director of the theater. Fialka became a significant, world-famous figure in pantomime art with his unique style and acting skills. His famous plays are Etudes, The Nose (Gogol), Dreams. He traveled the whole world with his company. He also performed with his theater in Budapest in 1981.

References

Sources
 https://www.tanecniaktuality.cz/en/personalities/double-anniversary-of-ladislav-fialka-leading-figure-of-european-mime
 https://www.fdb.cz/lidi-zivotopis-biografie/18915-ladislav-fialka.html

1931 births
1991 deaths
Czech mimes
Czech male actors
Czech choreographers
Czech scenic designers